Tana is a village under administration of the tehsil of Sihor, Bhavnagar district (14 kilometres from the district headquarters, Bhavnagar), Gujarat, India.

Demographics and geography 
Tana's native language is Gujarati. As of 2011, Tana's population of 10,774 people lives in 1927 households. Tana also has:

 a female population of 5,236.
 a literacy rate of 67.2%; a female literacy rate of 29.3.
 a Scheduled Tribes and Castes population of 740.
 a working proportion of the population of 39.4%.
 a population of 1,334 people under 6 years of age; 559 females.
 0.318 square kilometres of non-agricultural land.
 2.203 square kilometres of irrigated land.
 one primary health care center and two secondary health centers.

References 

Villages in Bhavnagar district